The Smith & Wesson Model K-38 Target Masterpiece Revolver Model 14 is a six-shot, double-action revolver with adjustable open sights built on the medium-size "K" frame. A small batch were made with  barrels, and even fewer were made with  barrels. First produced in 1947 and originally known as the K-38 Target Masterpiece, it was renamed the Model 14 in 1957 when all Smith & Wesson revolvers were given numerical model numbers. It is built on the same medium-sized frame (K-frame) as the seminal Smith & Wesson Model 10 ("Military and Police") revolver. The K-38 model was authorized for duty with the Los Angeles Police Department in the 1960s and early 1970s.

Variants
The Model 14 Masterpiece Single-Action was available in 1961 and 1962. It came with a  barrel and functioned in single-action only. It was otherwise identical to the rest of the Model 14s.

Smith & Wesson also released a Model 14 in their "Classics" line. A nickel-plated version has since been discontinued, but the blued-steel version is still available. Other than the finishes, the revolvers were identical with  barrels, a pinned Patridge front sight, a micro-adjustable rear sight, and wood grips.

During the years 1965 - 1968 a serial number range of the Model 14-2 was acquired by the Dayton Gun Headquarters of Dayton, Ohio.  Smith and Wesson allowed this gun distributor to block a number of serial numbers for a special run of 14-2 handguns.  These handguns were distinctive in that they were all Model 14-2, 4-inch revolvers with a Baughman front sight and a mixture of standard or target hammers, triggers and stocks.  The "Dayton" guns are a hybrid involving a shortened Model 14 barrel with a Model 15 sight.  The Dayton guns were made in four separate blocks of serial numbers.  They are:  1) K623337 - K623737 (401 pieces); 2) K623857 - K624496 (640 pieces); 3) K660288 - K661087 (800 pieces); 4) K661389 - K 661585 (197 pieces) for a total of 2038 pieces; during years 1965-1968.

Besides the aforementioned "Dayton Guns" and as noted in the beginning of this article, other 4-inch barreled models were produced.  Specifically a group of these revolvers were ordered with 4-inch barrels for the Kansas City, Missouri Police Commission.  This information has been verified through Smith and Wesson Archive letters of authenticity.  These revolvers were slightly different having a standard barrel thickness as opposed to the heavy barrels displayed on the "Dayton Guns".  “Bill Jabin notation”

See also
 Smith & Wesson Model 15
 Smith & Wesson Model 17
 List of firearms

References

Smith & Wesson revolvers
Revolvers of the United States
.38 Special firearms
Police weapons